The 11th edition of the Tanzania Music Awards took place at the Diamond Jubilee Hall in Dar es Salaam, on Friday 14 May 2010. The event was anchored by Jokate Mwegelo. Bongo Flava singer Diamond Platnumz was the big winner of the night with three awards out of four nominations, which is a remarkable result for a newcomer.

Nominees and Winners
Winners are in bold text.

Best Male Singer
Banana Zorro
Ali Kiba
Christian Bella
Marlow
Mzee Yusuph

Best Female Singer
Lady Jaydee
Khadija Yusuph
Maunda Zoro
Mwasiti
Vumilia

Best Song Writer
Mzee Yusuf
Banana Zorro
Fid Q
Lady Jaydee
Mrisho Mpoto
Mzee Abuu

Best Upcoming Artist
Diamond Platnumz
Amini
Barnaba Classic
Belle 9
Quick Racka

Best Hip Hop Artist
Chid Benzi
Fid Q
Joh Makini
Mangwea
Professor J

Best Rapper (from a Band)
Kitokololo
Chokoraa
Diouf
Ferguson
Totoo Ze Bingwa

Best Song
Diamond Platnumz - 'Kamwambie'
Banana Zorro - 'Zoba'
Hussein M - 'Kwa Ajili Yako'
Marlow - 'Pii Pii'
Mrisho Mpoto - 'Nikipata Nauli'

Best Music Video
CPwaa - 'Problems'
AY - 'Leo'
Banana Zorro - 'Zoba'
Diamond Platnumz - 'Kamwambie'
Lady Jaydee - 'Natamani Kuwa Malaika'

Best Afro Pop Song
Marlaw - 'Pii Pii'
Ali Kiba - 'Usiniseme'
Banana Zorro - 'Zoba'
Chege - 'Karibu Kiumeni'
Mataluma - 'Mama Ubaya'

Best R&B Song
Diamond Platnumz - 'Kamwambie'
AT featuring Stara Thomas - 'Nipigie' 
Belle 9 - 'Masogange'
Maunda Zoro - 'Mapenzi ya Wawili'
Steve - 'Sogea Karibu'

Best Hip Hop Song
Joh Makini - 'Stimu Zimelipiwa'
Chid Benz - 'Pom Pom Pisha'
Fid Q - 'Im a professional'
Mangwea - 'CNN'
Quick Racka - 'Bullet'

Best Collaboration Song
AT ft Stara Thomas - 'Nipigie'
Barnaba Classic ft Pipi - 'Njia Panda'
Mwana FA ft ProfessorJay, Sugu - 'Nazeeka Sana'
Hussein Machozi  ft Joh Makini - 'Utaipenda'
Mangwea ft Fid Q - 'CNN'

Best Swahili Song (from a Band)
African Stars Band - 'Mwana Dar es Salaam'
African Stars B - 'Shida Darasa'
Extra Bongo - 'Mjini Mipango'
FM Academia - 'Vuta Nikuvute'
K-Mondo - 'Magambo'
Machozi Band - 'Nilizama'
Wahapahapa - 'Chei Chei'

Best Album (from a Band)
African Stars Band - 'Mwana Dar es Salaam'
Kalunde Band - 'Hilda'
Msondo Ngoma - 'Huna Shukurani'

Best Ragga/Dancehall Song
Bwana Misosi - 'Mungu Yuko Bize'
Benjamini wa Mambo J - 'Fly'
Drezzy Chief - 'Wasanii'
Dully Sykes - 'Shikide'

Best Reggae Song
AY ft Wahu - 'Leo (Reggae remix)'
Dabo ft Mwasiti - 'Don't Let I Go'
Hemedi - 'Alcohol'
Matonya/Bella -'Umoja ni nguvu'
Man Snepa - 'Barua'

Best Taarab Song
Jahazi Modern Taraab - 'Daktari wa Mapenzi'
5 Star - 'Wapambe Msitujadili'
5 Star - 'Riziki Mwanzo wa chuki'
Coast - 'Kukupenda isiwe taabu'
Jahazi Modern Taraab - 'Roho Mbaya Haijengi'

Best Taarab Album
Jahazi Modern Taraab - 'Daktari wa Mapenzi'
5 Stars - 'Riziki Mwanzo wa chuki'
Coast - 'Kukupenda isiwe taabu'
EA Melody - 'Kilamtu kivyakevyake'
New ZNZ Stars - 'Poa Mpenzi'

Best East African Song
/ Kidum and Juliana - 'Haturudi Nyuma'
 Blu*3,  Radio & Weasel - 'Where you are'
 Cindy - 'Na wewe'
 Kidum - 'Umenikosea'
  Radio & Weasel - 'Bread and Butter'

Best Traditional Song
Mrisho Mpoto - 'Nikipata Nauli'
Machozi Band - 'Mtarimbo'
Offside Trick - 'Samaki'
Omari Omari - 'Kupata Majaliwa'
Wahapahapa Band - 'Chei Chei'

Best Producer
Lamar
Man Water
Marco Chali
Hermy B

Hall of Fame trophy
to an individual: Zahir Zorro
to an institution: Clouds FM

See also
Tanzania Music Awards

References
Tanzania Music Awards Official website Retrieved 30 September 2012

External links
Tanzania Music Awards Official website

Tanzania music awards
Music awards
Tanzania music awards